Ouyang Xiaoping (born 24 January 1961) is a Chinese nuclear physicist who is a deputy director of the Department of Energy and Mining Engineering, Chinese Academy of Engineering, and an academician of the Chinese Academy of Engineering. He was an alternate member of the 19th Central Committee of the Chinese Communist Party.

Biography
Ouyang was born in Haikou, Guangdong (now belonged to Hainan), on 24 January 1961, while his ancestral home in Ningyuan County, Hunan. He joined the Chinese Communist Party (CCP) in October 1991. From 1999 to 2000, he was a visiting scholar at the Oak Ridge National Laboratory in the United States. In 2002, he received his doctor's degree in particle physics and nuclear physics from Fudan University. From 2004 to 2006, he was a postdoctoral fellow at Tsinghua University. 

In June 2014, he was recruited as dean of the School of Materials Science and Engineering, Xiangtan University. In October 2017, he became an alternate member of the 19th Central Committee of the Chinese Communist Party. In 2022, he took office as deputy director of the Department of Energy and Mining Engineering, Chinese Academy of Engineering.

Personal life 
Ouyang is married and has a daughter.

Honours and awards
 2012 Science and Technology Progress Award of the Ho Leung Ho Lee Foundation
 2013 Member of the Chinese Academy of Engineering (CAE)

References

1961 births
Living people
People from Haikou
Scientists from Hainan
People's Republic of China politicians from Hainan
Chinese Communist Party politicians from Hainan
Members of the Chinese Academy of Engineering
Alternate members of the 19th Central Committee of the Chinese Communist Party